Aaron James Lewis (born 26 June 1998) is a Welsh professional footballer who plays for Newport County as a full-back. He is a Wales Under-21 international.

Early and personal life
Born in Swansea, Lewis is the nephew of former footballer Kenny Morgans.

Club career

Swansea City
Lewis began his career with Swansea City at the age of 9, making three appearances for their under-23 team in the EFL Trophy during the 2016–17 season, four appearances (with one goal) for the under-21 team in the EFL Trophy during the 2017–18 season, and three appearances (with one goal) for the under-21 team in the EFL Trophy during the 2018–19 season.

He moved on loan to Doncaster Rovers in January 2019. He made his professional debut on 2 February 2019, in a 1–1 League draw away at Portsmouth. He was praised by Grant McCann for his performance in that match. He was released by Swansea in July 2019.

Lincoln City
On 10 August 2019 Lewis signed a short-term contract with Lincoln City, making his debut on 13 August in Lincoln's 1–0 EFL Cup win at Huddersfield. On 13 January 2020, Lewis signed a new 18-month contract with Lincoln, lasting until summer 2021.

On 16 October 2020, Lewis joined Newport County on loan until 2 January 2021. He made his debut for Newport on 12 December 2020 in the starting line-up for the 2–1 League Two defeat against Leyton Orient.

On 1 February 2021 it was announced he had left Lincoln by mutual consent.

Newport County
A day later Lewis returned to Newport County, signing a contract until the end of the 2020–21 season. He scored his first goal for Newport on 20 April 2021 in the 2-0 League 2 win against Crawley Town. Lewis played for Newport in the League Two playoff final at Wembley Stadium on 31 May 2021 which Newport lost to Morecambe, 1-0 after a 107th-minute penalty. In June 2021 Lewis extended his Newport contract by a further two years.

International career
In May 2017, Lewis was named in the Wales under-20 squad for the 2017 Toulon Tournament. He featured in two of Wales' three group matches, against the Ivory Coast and Bahrain as Wales were eliminated in the group stage.

Lewis has represented Wales at under-21 level, winning 13 caps.

Playing style
Primarily a full-back, Lewis has also featured as a central midfielder.

Career statistics

References

1998 births
Living people
Welsh footballers
Footballers from Swansea
Swansea City A.F.C. players
Doncaster Rovers F.C. players
English Football League players
Association football fullbacks
Wales under-21 international footballers
Lincoln City F.C. players
Newport County A.F.C. players
Wales youth international footballers